Jacaranda arborea is a species of flowering plant in the family Bignoniaceae. It is endemic to Cuba.  It is threatened by habitat loss.

References

Trees of Cuba
arborea
Vulnerable plants
Taxonomy articles created by Polbot